This article is about the 1970 Indian film. For the novel on which the film is based on, see Ara Nazhika Neram.

Ara Nazhika Neram (Half nazhika or 12 minutes) is a 1970 Malayalam film, directed by K. S. Sethumadhavan and written by Parappurath, based on his own novel of the same name. Parappurath also played a minor role in the film. The story of the film revolves around an orthodox Christian family headed by Kunjenachan (Kottarakkara Sreedharan Nair), a ninety-year-old patriarch who lives his life by The Book. The film also features Prem Nazir, Sathyan, Ragini, Sheela, K. P. Ummer, Adoor Bhasi and Ambika Sukumaran.

Cast
 Kottarakkara Sreedharan Nair as Kunjonachan Mappila
 Sathyan as Mathukutty, Kunjonachan's 5th Son
 Prem Nazir as Rajan, Maathukutty's Son
 Ragini as Deenamma, Mathukutty's Wife
 Sheela as Santhamma, Rajan's Wife
 Sankaradi as Geevarghese, Kunjonachan's Elder Son
 Ambika Sukumaran as Kuttiamma, Daughter of Geevargheese
 Adoor Bhasi as Sivarama Kurup
 K. P. Ummer as Thomas, Kuttiamma's husband
 Bahadur as Kunju Cherukkan, Kunjonachan's 3rd Son
 N. Govindan Kutty as Philippose, Kunjonachan's 4th Son
 Meena as Annamma, Wife of Philippose
 Jessey as Danny, Kunjucherukkan's Son
 Jose Prakash as Priest
 Muthukulam Raghavan Pilla as Lonaan, Kunjonachan's old friend

Soundtrack

Awards
 Kerala State Film Awards (1970)
 Best Director -  K. S. Sethumadhavan
 Best Story - Parappurath
 Best Actor - Kottarakkara Sreedharan Nair

References

External links
 

1970 films
1970s Malayalam-language films
Films based on Indian novels
Films directed by K. S. Sethumadhavan